The Bangladeshi Ambassador to the Saudi Arabia is the official representative of the Government of Bangladesh to the Government of the Saudi Arabia.

List of ambassadors

A partial list is available on the website of the Embassy of Bangladesh in Riyadh.

 Mohammad Javed Patwary (22 August 2020 –)
 Golam Moshi (24 February 2015 – 31 July 2020)
 Mohammed Shahidul Islam (27 December 2010 – 3 February 2015)
 M. Fazlul Karim (5 August 2008 - 8 December 2010)
 S.M. Ikramul Haque (8 November 2004 - 19 July 2008)
 S. K. Sharjil Hassan (28 July 2002 - 18 October 2004)
 Mahboob Alam (17 April 2000 - 4 June 2002)
 Abdul Momen Choudhury (23 January 1997 – 7 February 2000)
 Quazi Golam Dastgir (2 February 1988 – 31 December 1991)
 Hedayet Ahmed (1 August 1985 – 30 January 1988)
 Mohammad Mohsin (1981 – 1985)
 Humayun Rashid Choudhury (10 June 1976 – 17 October 1981), first ambassador of Bangladesh to the Kingdom of Saudi Arabia.

References 

 
Saudi Arabia
Bangladesh